This is a list of Hungarian football transfers for the 2010 summer transfer window by club. Only transfers of clubs in the Soproni Liga and Hungarian National Championship II are included.

The summer transfer window opened on 1 June 2010, although a few transfers may have taken place prior to that date. The window closed at midnight on 31 August 2010. Players without a club may join one at any time, either during or in between transfer windows.

Soproni Liga

Budapest Honvéd FC

In:

Out:

Debreceni VSC

In:

Out:

Ferencvárosi TC

In:

Out:

Győri ETO FC

In:

Out:

Kaposvári Rákóczi FC

In:

Out:

Kecskeméti TE

In:

Out:

Lombard-Pápa TFC

In:

Out:

MTK Budapest FC

In:

Out:

Paksi SE

In:

Out:

BFC Siófok

In:

Out:

Szolnoki MÁV FC

In:

Out:

Szombathelyi Haladás

In:

Out:

Újpest FC

In:

Out:

Vasas SC

In:

Out:

Videoton FC

In:

Out:

Zalaegerszegi TE

In:

Out:

External links
Nemzeti Sport 
Pepsifoci

References

Hungarian
Football transfers in summer
2010